Field secretary is a position within various civil rights organizations in the United States, such as the National Association for the Advancement of Colored People (NAACP) and the Student Nonviolent Coordinating Committee (SNCC). In the NAACP, it was the highest-ranking position of each state chapter of the organization.

Notable field secretaries
 Ella Baker
 Medgar Evers
 Fannie Lou Hamer
 James Weldon Johnson
 John Lewis
 Gilbert R. Mason
 Rosa Parks
 Walter F. White
 Bob Zellner

References 

NAACP
Student Nonviolent Coordinating Committee